Thomas Sutherland may refer to:

Thomas W. Sutherland (ca. 1817–1859), early settler and attorney in San Diego, California
Thomas Sutherland (banker) (1834–1922), Scottish banker in Hong Kong
Thomas Sutherland (British Army officer) (1888–1946), British Army officer
Thomas Sutherland (academic) (1931–2016), former Dean of Agriculture in Lebanon, kidnapped by Islamic Jihad
Thomas Sutherland (cricketer) (1880–?), English first-class cricketer
Thomas Sutherland (artist) (1785–1838), painter of maritime and naval subjects

See also
 Tom Sutherland (disambiguation)